The Brandau Rocks are rock exposures  west of Carapace Nunatak in Victoria Land. They were reconnoitered by the New Zealand Antarctic Research Program Allan Hills Expedition (1964), who named the rocks for Lieutenant Commander James F. Brandau, U.S. Navy, a helicopter pilot who made a difficult rescue flight to evacuate an injured member of the expedition.

The rescue on 23 November 1964 is recounted in the memoir of the leader, Adrian Heyter and reported on the James F. Brandau entry.

References 

Rock formations of Oates Land